"Sign of the Times"  is a song by Bryan Ferry, the former lead vocalist for Roxy Music. It was released as the second single from his fifth solo studio album The Bride Stripped Bare in 1978, being Ferry's thirteenth single. The single peaked at number 37 in the UK Singles Chart, but failed to chart elsewhere. The single also features the non-album track, "Four Letter Love" as the B-side. The promotional music video performance, was shot on the first episode of The Kenny Everett Video Show in 1978.

Personnel
 Bryan Ferry – lead vocals 
 Waddy Wachtel – guitar
 Neil Hubbard – guitar
 Rick Marotta – drums
 Alan Spenner – bass
 Ann O'Dell – piano and string arrangements

References

External links
 

1978 singles
Bryan Ferry songs
Songs written by Bryan Ferry
1978 songs
Polydor Records singles